is a Japanese video game franchise developed, published and owned by Bandai Namco Entertainment, a video game publisher that was previously known as Namco. Entries have been developed by a wide array of other video game companies, including Midway Games, Atari and Mass Media, Inc., and was created by Toru Iwatani. The eponymous first entry was released in arcades in 1980 by Namco, and published by Midway Games in North America. Most Pac-Man games are maze chase games, but it has also delved into other genres, such as platformers, racing, and sports. Several games in the series were released for a multitude of home consoles and are included in many Bandai Namco video game compilations.

Pac-Man is one of the longest-running, best-selling, and highest-grossing video game franchises in history, and the game has seen regular releases for over 40 years, has sold nearly 48 million copies across all of the platforms, and has grossed over US$14 billion, most of which has been from the original arcade game. The character of Pac-Man is the official mascot of Bandai Namco, and is one of the most recognizable video game characters in history. The franchise has been seen as important and influential, and is often used as a representation for 1980s popular culture and video games as a whole.

Arcade games

Home console, handheld console, and PC games

Compilations

iOS and/or Android games
Pac-Man has many games on iOS and Android.

Also having been released as iOS applications are ports of the original Pac-Man, Ms. Pac-Man, Pac-Mania, and Pac-Man Championship Edition (all of these except for Pac-Mania have also been released on Android). Emulated versions of the original Pac-Man and Pac-Land are included in the defunct Namco Arcade application for iOS and Android. There was also a Pac-Man themed Twitter application for iOS devices, the Pac-Man Live Wallpaper application for iOS and Android devices, the Pac-Man Watch Face for Android Wear, and Pac-Man Moving Stickers for iOS. In July 2015, Pac-Man Championship Edition DX was released on both iOS and Android. Both versions were discontinued in March 2020.

Other titles

Cancelled Pac-Man games 

Pac-Man Museum was released on Xbox Live Arcade (Xbox 360), PlayStation Network (PS3) and Windows PC (through Steam); the planned Nintendo eShop release for Wii U and 3DS was cancelled. Pac-Man and the Ghostly Adventures 2 was also originally going to have a Windows PC version.

See also
 List of maze video games
 List of Namco games
 List of Pac-Man clones

Notes

References

Pac-Man
List
Pac-Man